The Mercedes-Benz EQS SUV is a battery electric full-size luxury crossover SUV produced by the German automobile manufacturer Mercedes-Benz Group. An SUV counterpart of the EQS liftback, it is positioned as the battery electric version of the GLS. It is the third model built on the dedicated Electric Vehicle Architecture, following the EQS and the EQE sedan. The model also offers optional third-row seating.

Overview 

The vehicle was unveiled on 19 April 2022. Three versions will be offered, which are EQS 450, EQS 450 4MATIC, and EQS 580 4MATIC.

The vehicle received a large 56-inch MBUX Hyperscreen system that includes the instrument cluster, infotainment screen, and passenger display that runs across the car’s dashboard.

Models 
The specifications include:

References

External links 
 Official press release (United States)

EQS SUV
Cars introduced in 2022
Full-size sport utility vehicles
Luxury crossover sport utility vehicles
All-wheel-drive vehicles
Production electric cars
Flagship vehicles
Mercedes-EQ
Motor vehicles manufactured in the United States